The Fokker V.9 was part of a series of experimental aircraft which led up to the low-production D.VI fighter. The aircraft were very similar, varying in detail and power plants.

The V.9 was powered by a 60 kW (80 hp) Oberursel and first flew in December 1917; all others flew in 1918.

The V.12 was powered by an experimental 119 kW (160 hp), Steyr-Le Rhône engine.

The V.14. Like the V.12, the V.14 was powered by the 119 kW (160 hp) Steyr-Le Rhone.

The V.16 was powered by the 81 kW (110 hp) Oberursel Ur. II.

The V.33 was a development of the V.9. It was tested with both 82 kW (110 hp) and 108 kW (145 hp) Oberursel engines.

Bibliography

References

 http://www.dutch-aviation.nl/index5/Military/index5-1%20Fokker%20Military%20Aircrafts.html

1910s German fighter aircraft
V.09
Rotary-engined aircraft
Single-engined tractor aircraft
Biplanes
Aircraft first flown in 1917